Allapur may refer to the following places :

 Allapur, Yadadri Bhuvanagiri, Telangana
 Allapur, Uttar Pradesh, Budaun, Uttar Pradesh